V for Vaselines is the third studio album by the Scottish alternative rock band The Vaselines. It was recorded at Castle of Doom studios in Glasgow and was released in the UK on 29 September 2014 and in the US on 7 October 2014 through The Vaselines' own label, Rosary Music.

The album's sound was partially inspired by the Ramones, after Eugene Kelly went to see a Ramones cover band in Glasgow. Kelly stated that they wanted to "write some really short punk rock songs, just get into people’s ear really straight away, and then get out of there really quickly." McKee was also surrounded by punk music, as her children were discovering the Ramones and The Stooges at the time the album was being made

The first single from the album, "One Lost Year" was released online on 28 May 2014 along with the announcement of the album. It was made available to download for free from the band's SoundCloud page. A second single followed in August, "High Tide Low Tide", which was released as a download and on limited edition blue vinyl, accompanied by the non-album B-side "Cardinal Sin". A music video for third single, "Crazy Lazy", was released in November. The band toured in support of the album with shows in the US and Europe into 2015.

The album's lyrics were inspired by many current events including the death of Margaret Thatcher, the Leveson Inquiry and the popularity of MP3 downloads. The Vaselines have also noted that a seriousness and sense of maturity has developed slightly in their lyrics.

Track listing
All tracks written and composed by Eugene Kelly/Frances McKee
  "High Tide Low Tide" – 3:36
  "The Lonely LP" – 3:37
  "Inky Lies" – 3:14
  "Crazy Lady" – 2:50
  "Single Spies" – 4:22
  "One Lost Year" – 3:30
  "Earth Is Speeding" – 2:38
  "False Heaven" – 3:52
  "Number One Crush" – 2:22
  "Last Half Hour" – 3:54
  "Devil Moon" (iTunes Bonus Track) – 2:55
  "Messy Reflection" (iTunes Bonus Track) – 3:02

Personnel
The Vaselines
Eugene Kelly – guitar, vocals
Frances McKee – guitar, vocals, keyboards on "The Lonely L.P." and "Inky Lies"
Michael McGaughrin – drums
Graeme Smillie – bass guitar
Francis MacDonald – piano on "Inky Lies", electric piano on "Single Spies"
Paul Foley - guitar on "High Tide Low Tide", "Earth Is Speeding" and "False Heaven"
Scott Paterson - guitar on "One Lost Year" and "Earth Is Speeding"
Stevie Jackson – guitar on "High Tide Low Tide" and "False Heaven"

References

External links

2010 albums
The Vaselines albums